Nassima Saleha Ben Hamouda Akouche (born October 20, 1973 in Villeurbanne, France) is a retired  Algerian international volleyball player.

Club information
Last club : MC Alger (Algeria)

References

Algerian women's volleyball players
Volleyball players at the 2008 Summer Olympics
Olympic volleyball players of Algeria
Living people
1973 births
People from Villeurbanne
French sportspeople of Algerian descent
Sportspeople from Lyon Metropolis